Itatí is a town in the north of the province of Corrientes, Argentina. It lies some 60 km east of the provincial capital Corrientes, by the Paraná River, not far upstream from its confluence with the Paraguay River, on the northern provincial border, which is also the international border with Paraguay.

The origin of Itatí was a reduction (indigenous town) established on 7 December 1615 by Franciscan friar Luis de Bolaños, with the name of Pura y Limpia Concepción de Nuestra Señora de Itatí. The proper foundation of Itatí as a town was by general Pedro Ferré, on 15 September 1825.

Despite its small size, Itatí is renowned throughout the country due to the massive displays of devotion to the local advocation of the Virgin Mary. The physical center of these is the basilica (built in 1950), which preserves an allegedly miraculous wooden image of the Virgin of Itatí. On her feast day, 16 July, thousands of pilgrims from nearby and faraway regions, and even from neighbouring countries, come to Itatí to venerate the Virgin.
 
The name Itatí comes from Guaraní, but there is disagreement as to its exact meaning; ita- undoubtedly corresponds to the Guaraní word for "stone" (appearing in a number of other toponyms, such as Itaipu), while the last part could refer to (moro)ti ("white") or tí  ("nose").

References 

 
 Argentina Total. Corrientes - Itatí.
 Web site. Itati Web site.

Populated places in Corrientes Province
Paraná River
Cities in Argentina
Argentina
Corrientes Province